Kim Chan-mi is a Korean name consisting of the family name Kim and the given name Chan-mi, and may also refer to:

 Kim Chan-mi (sport shooter) (born 1989), South Korean sport shooter
 Kim Chanmi (singer) (born 1996), South Korean singer